Majorstuen is a particularly affluent neighbourhood in the Frogner borough in the inner part of Oslo, Norway.

Majorstuen is known for its vibrant downtown and especially its shopping area. The area has several elegant townhouses c. 1880–1890. The area is also an important public transport junction in Oslo, where all metro lines, three tram lines and five bus lines operate. It is served by Majorstuen station.

The name
The neighborhood was named after a well-known public house that was located on the east side of Sørkedalsveien. Dating from the 1700s, the house was named for Captain Michael Wilhelm von Sundt (1679–1753). The last element is the finite form of stue 'cabin, house with a single room'. There has long been a disagreement about the forms Majorstuen and Majorstua: stuen is the articulated form when stue is treated as a masculine, and stua is the articulated form when it is treated as a feminine noun. The original pronunciation was -stua (Norwegian feminine inflection) but, because Danish was the only written language in Norway well into the 19th century, the name was written -stuen (Danish common gender inflection). The locals say either, but the local borough council has also adopted Majorstuen as the official name of the area. (For a similar disagreement, see Akerselva.)

Majorstuen Church
Majorstuen Church (Majorstuen kirke) was consecrated on 26 March 1926 as Priest's Church (Prestenes kirke) when it was built for the funds collected among Norwegian clergymen. Oslo Municipality took over the church in the 1960s and changed its name to Majorstuen Church. Majorstuen Church was designed by architects August Nielsen (1877–1956) and Harald Sund (1876–1940) in the style of Classicism with influences of art deco and neo-baroque. The main church has 400 seats and was built of brick. The chapel, Cappella Johannea,  is decorated with frescos with themes from the Book of Revelation, executed by the artist Per Vigeland (1904–1968)  in 1932.  The altar  picture is titled: The Christian Hope (Det kristne håp). The tapestry is by designer and textile artist, Else Marie Jakobsen.

Majorstuen School
Majorstuen school is the primary and secondary school in Majorstuen. The school was designed by architect Bredo Henrik Berntsen (1877–1957). The first phase was completed in 1908.

Majorstuen  Station
Majorstuen station (Majorstuen stasjon) is the last common point for all subway lines on the western side of Oslo. The station was opened in 1898 as the terminus for Holmenkollbanen. It remained so until Smestadbanen was completed in 1912. In 1928 the tunnel to the National Theatre station (called the Underground Railway) was built.  The original station building was built in 1916, when  Tryvandsbanen  was completed. It was designed by Erik Glosimodt who also designed a number of shelters and station buildings along Holmenkollbanen. It had two entrances, one for Holmenkollbanen, and one for  Smestadbanen. When the work of underground track started, the station was destroyed. The  current Majorstuen station dates to 1930 and was  designed by  Kristoffer Lange.

References

Other sources
Sandnes, Jørn; Ola Stemshaug (1997, 3rd edition 2007) Norsk Stadnamnleksikon (4th edition)'' (Det Norske Samlaget)

External links
Majorstuen
Majorstuen Church
Majorstuen School

 
Neighbourhoods of Oslo